1988 Grand Prix may refer to:

 1988 Grand Prix (snooker)
 1988 Grand Prix (tennis)